Platyoides grandidieri is a spider species in the genus Platyoides found in Kenya, Madagascar, Aldabra and Réunion.

See also 
 List of Trochanteriidae species
 List of spiders of Madagascar

References

External links 

Trochanteriidae
Spiders of Africa
Arthropods of Kenya
Spiders of Madagascar
Spiders of Réunion
Spiders described in 1903